Matania is an extinct genus of ptychopariid trilobite in the family Catillicephalidae. It lived from 501 to 490 million years ago during the Dresbachian faunal stage of the late Cambrian Period.  Most species are from Greenland, but some species are also found at the Cow Head formation in western Newfoundland, and at least one occurrence of the genus is in Kazakhstan

References

Ptychopariida
Ptychopariida genera
Cambrian trilobites
Fossils of Greenland
Fossils of Kazakhstan